Calapai is a surname. Notable people with the surname include:

Letterio Calapai (1902–1993), American artist
Luca Calapai (born 1993), Italian footballer